Emma Tyler Fielding Baker Dec. 5, 1828 - Jan. 20, 1916) was a member of the Mohegan Pequot Indian tribe and was posthumously awarded the title of Mohegan medicine woman in 1992. Medicine women were culture-bearers and required to have an in-depth knowledge of tribal customs and possess good leadership qualities.  She was also a tribal historian and ceremonial leader of the Mohegan Tribe.

Early life and family 
Baker was born in the village of Mohegan (now Fort Shantok, Montville, Conn.) on December 5, 1828, to Francis Fielding and Rachel Commenwas Hoscott and was one of ten children. As an adult, Baker helped preserve tribal historical records and oral traditions thus becoming known as a culture-bearer. Baker married a Mohegan man named Henry Greenwood Baker on November 30, 1854, who became the father of her eight children.

Leadership within the tribe 

In 1860, Baker served as the president of the Church Ladies Sewing Society which was considered to be an auxiliary of the Mohegan Church. This group of women worked to preserve Mohegan culture and, as part of their matriarchal role within the tribe, considered new chiefs and decided land claims. This group met regularly at the Mohegan Church in Montville, Conn. One of Baker's actions as president was to restore an ancient Mohegan Green Corn Festival nicknamed the "Wigwam Festival" ("wigwam" meaning "welcome"). This Festival continues into the present as a celebration of Mohegan tribal culture and is annually held during the third weekend in August. Because the Mohegan Green Corn Festival was to be held on the grounds of the Mohegan Congregational Church (whose land was tribally owned), this provided solidarity for the tribe in the following years when the reservation land was eventually broken up. Baker also served as a Sunday School teacher at the Mohegan Church.

Baker was elected president of the Mohegan Indian League in 1896. She represented the Mohegan Nation before the all-white, all-male Connecticut legislature as part of an endeavor to protect Mohegan land and sacred sites. She also chaired the Mohegan tribal council. and documented the desecration of the Norwich Royal Mohegan Burial Ground. Baker also lent some "Indian Relics" to the Converse Art Gallery in Norwich, Conn., for display in honor of the anniversary of the town on Saturday, July 3, 1909; this display was curated by the Daughters of the American Revolution. Long after her death, she was posthumously elected as a member of the Connecticut Women's Hall of Fame in 1994.

Later life and legacy 
Baker was a "nanu" (mentor or respected elder woman) to her niece Gladys Tantaquidgeon, by instructing her in tribal spirituality and herbal medicine which Baker had learned from Martha Uncas, her grand-aunt.

Baker died on January 20, 1916, and is buried at Shantok Burial Grounds in Uncasville, Conn. Baker was immortalized in 2017 by artist Adam Chambers when he created her portrait for one of eleven ornaments to decorate one of the 56 trees representing each U.S. state and territory at the President's Park in Washington, D.C. She was selected because she is considered a Connecticut native who dedicated her life to promote tolerance and diversity.

Ralph W. Sturges (1918-2007), Baker's great grandson, was instrumental in assisting the Mohegan Tribe achieve construction of the Mohegan Sun Casino on 240 acres of the Tribe's reservation land in Uncasville, Conn. The casino opened October 12, 1996, eighty years after Baker's death. With proceeds from this casino, the Mohegan Tribe was able to contribute $10 million to the Smithsonian Institution toward building the National Museum of the American Indian.

Gallery

References

People from Connecticut
1828 births
1916 deaths
Indigenous American traditional healers
Native American leaders
19th-century Native American women
19th-century Native Americans
20th-century Native American women
20th-century Native Americans
Mohegan people
Native American history of Connecticut
Burials in Connecticut
20th-century American women physicians
Native American people from Connecticut